The aggressive riverhawk, (Onychothemis tonkinensis) is a species of dragonfly in the family Libellulidae. It is widespread in many Asian countries. 3 subspecies are recognized.

Subspecies
 Onychothemis tonkinensis ceylanica Ris, 1912
 Onychothemis tonkinensis siamensis Fraser, 1932
 Onychothemis tonkinensis tonkinensis Martin, 1904

References

Sources
 tonkinensis.html World Dragonflies
 Animal diversity web
 Sri Lanka Biodiversity

See also 
 List of odonates of Sri Lanka
 List of odonates of India

Libellulidae